St. Anthony's College, Wattala is a catholic boys' school in Wattala, Sri Lanka.

History 

On 5 April 1942, Colombo was subjected to aerial bombing by the Japanese military for about 90 minutes. Many residents fled, with one group who traveled to the village of Wattala not wishing to return. 

The influx highlighted the town's need for a school. On 4 May 1942, a permanent school opened, with Bro. Vincent Joseph as Director, assisted by four other brothers. This school was a branch of three schools: St. Benedict's College; St. Joseph's College; and De la Salle College.  

The initial enrollment was 88 students. Most classes were housed in the shed, adjacent to the main building where the brothers lodged. Senior classes were held in the main house. The living conditions for the brothers were not comfortable absent electricity and running water. The Brothers had to draw water from a well to bathe and wash.

In addition to the three schools already mentioned, boys came from Royal, St. Joseph's College, Ananda College, De Mazenod College, and other outstation schools. Most of these boys returned to their respective schools when conditions improved in Colombo. 

Most of the property was heavily vegetated and as the school population grew, the need for a playground increased. The students used the commercial service grounds near the Hunupitiya railway station, for games and physical activities. A sizable playground was constructed adjacent to the school within a year, where outdoor games like cricket, football, and volleyball were organised. 1942 concluded with a Parents' Day celebration. A temporary stage was put up at one end of the shed and each class contributed an item. 

1943 several students returned to Colombo replaced by local boys. Absent  facilities, the director of St. Benedict's College, Colombo allowed his laboratory to be used once a week for practical work in physics and chemistry. Ten students were presented for the first time for the SSC, which they all passed.

Bro. Vincent Joseph, the school's director started taking steps to make the school independent and not a branch school. With the help of organised meetings of parents and the chiefs of the various religious organisations, he petitioned for a new school. The Education Ministry bowed to public opinion allowing and the new school was officially established.

Houses 
The students are divided into four houses:

Vincent House  
 Named after Vincent Joseph Gottwald, the founder and the first director of the college.
 Color : Purple

Stephen House  
 Named after Stephen Harding, the second director of the college.
 Color : Green

Callixtus House  

 Named after Anslem Callixtus, the third director of the college.
 Color : Red

Austin House  

 Named after Austin Anthony, the fourth director of the college.
 Color : Pink

Notable alumni 

Avishka Tharindu - Cricket Player (2010-2020)
Manoj Hemaratne - First-class cricket player (1985–2000)
Thisara Perera - International cricket player (2011–2012)
Manjula Munasinghe - One Day International cricket player (1986–1991)
Chaminda Vass - International cricket player (1987–1993)
Malinda Lowe - record artist (1981)

Past directors and principals

Directors

Principals

References

Boys' schools in Sri Lanka
National schools in Sri Lanka
Schools in Gampaha District